Cleopatra of Macedonia (Greek: Κλεοπάτρα της Μακεδονίας; c. 355/354 BC – 308 BC), or Cleopatra of Epirus (Greek: Κλεοπάτρα της Ηπείρου) was an ancient Macedonian princess and later queen regent of Epirus. The daughter of Philip II of Macedon and Olympias of Epirus, she was the only full sibling of Alexander the Great. Her other siblings include half sisters Thessalonike and Cynane, and half-brother Philip III of Macedon.

Cleopatra grew up in the care of her mother in Pella. In 338 BC, Cleopatra stayed in Pella with her father while her mother Olympias fled to exile in Epirus with her Molossian brother Alexander I of Epirus (Cleopatra's uncle), and Cleopatra's brother Alexander fled to Illyria. Soon Philip felt he had to ally himself to Alexander I by offering his daughter's hand in marriage. A large wedding between Cleopatra and her uncle Alexander I was held in 336 BC. It was at the celebration of her nuptials, which took place on a magnificent scale at Aegae in Macedon, that Philip II was murdered.

Immediately after her father's murder, Cleopatra and her husband-uncle Alexander went from Macedon back to Epirus. Soon after, the couple had two children, Neoptolemus II of Epirus and Cadmeia. It is believed that her brother Alexander and Cleopatra kept in close contact while he was on his conquest to the east. In 332 BC Alexander had sent booty home for both his mother and sister, as well as his close friends.

In 334 BC, Cleopatra's husband crossed the Adriatic Sea to the Italian peninsula to campaign against several Italic tribes, the Lucanians and Bruttii, on behalf of the Greek colony Taras, leaving her as regent of Epirus. She was involved as recipient and sender of official shipments of grain during a widespread shortage around 334 BC. According to an inscription from Cyrene, Libya, she was the recipient of 50,000 'medimni' of grain, and shipped the surplus to Corinth. Alexander I conquered Heraclea, took Sipontum, and captured both Consentia and Terin, but was eventually killed in battle in 331 BC, leaving the young heir, Neoptolemus too young for the throne.

Cleopatra ruled Epirus in the meantime. It was an Epirote custom that the woman of a family became head of household when her husband died and their son(s) were too young, unlike the rest of Greece. It was only fitting for the powerful queen to assume control. When her husband was killed, an embassy from Athens was dispatched to deliver condolences.

Cleopatra was seemingly acting as the religious head of state for the people of Molossia. Her name appears on a list of Theorodokoi ("welcomers of sacred ambassadors"), in the recently established Epirote alliance. Cleopatra was significantly the only woman on the list. Her position as official welcomer would have allowed her to keep a finger on whatever was happening anywhere in Greece.

After the death of her brother, Cleopatra was sought in marriage by several of his generals, who thought to strengthen their influence with the Macedonians by a connection with the sister of Alexander the Great. Leonnatus is first mentioned as putting forward a claim to her hand, and he represented to Eumenes that he received a lettered promise of marriage if he came to Pella. Cleopatra had extended her hand because she knew Leonnatus had the ambition and ability to overthrow the new mentally unfit king Philip III of Macedon if they married. Meanwhile Leonnatus, before he arrived for the wedding and in an attempt to enhance his claim to the throne, stopped to lift the siege from the rebellious Greeks in Lamia and rescue Antipater. However he was killed in this action, so the marriage never occurred. 

Perdiccas next attempted, unsuccessfully, to win her in marriage. After his death, her hand was sought by Cassander, Lysimachus, and Antigonus. However she refused all these offers and escaped to Sardis, where she was kept for years in a sort of honourable captivity by Antigonus.

An interesting event took place there in Sardis. A frustrated Antipater publicly accused Cleopatra of being involved with Perdiccas in her half sister Cynane's death. Cleopatra would not submit so easily, however, and fought back.

Eventually, Cleopatra acceded to a proposal of marriage from Ptolemy, but before it occurred, she was captured. After being brought back to Sardis, she was assassinated, in 308 BC, reputedly by order of Antigonus. Despite afterwards executing the assassins and giving her a beautiful funeral in her honor, he knew she represented too much power to remain alive.

References

Further reading 
Carney, Elizabeth Donnelly.  Women and Monarchy in Macedonia. Oklahoma Series in Classical Culture. Univ. of Oklahoma Press: 2000.

External links
Cleopatra from Charles Smith, Dictionary of Greek and Roman Biography and Mythology (1867)
Cleopatra of Macedonia from Livius on ancient history by Jona Lendering

Family of Alexander the Great
350s BC births
308 BC deaths
4th-century BC Greek people
Ancient Epirote queens consort
Ancient Epirotes
Murdered royalty of Macedonia (ancient kingdom)
Ancient Pellaeans
4th-century BC women rulers